Born This Way may refer to:

Music
Born This Way (album), a 2011 album by Lady Gaga 
"Born This Way" (song), the title song
Born This Way: The Remix, a 2011 remix album by Lady Gaga
Born This Way (Cookie Crew album), 1989, as well as a single on the album
"Born This Way", a 2014 single by Thousand Foot Krutch from Oxygen: Inhale
"Born This Way", a song by Dusty Springfield from Reputation
"Born This Way", a song from the 1993 musical Whoop-Dee-Doo!

Television
Born This Way (TV series), 2015
"Born This Way" (Glee), an episode of Glee
"Born This Way", an episode of Being Erica

Other
 Born This Way, a fictional power in the manga JoJolion

See also
Born This Way Ball, a tour by Lady Gaga in support of her second studio album, Born This Way
Born This Way Foundation, a non-profit organization founded in 2011 by Lady Gaga and her mother, Cynthia Germanotta
"I Was Born This Way", a 1946 song by Stubby Kaye
"I Was Born This Way", a 1975 song by Valentino
Born That Way, a 1995 album by Boy Howdy